Jeffrey Ralph "Jeff" Holmstead is an American energy lobbyist and lawyer. He is a partner with Houston-based Bracewell LLP and a former deputy administrator of the Environmental Protection Agency in the George W. Bush administration.
  Bracewell LLP is formerly Bracewell & Giuliani, the international law firm of Rudy Giuliani.

Career
While he was an undergraduate at Brigham Young University, Jeff Holmstead sang bass in the choir.  He earned degrees in economics and English and decided to study law at Yale.  He began his legal career in 1987 after graduation from Yale Law School.

He was appointed and served as deputy administrator of the Environmental Protection Agency in the George W. Bush administration.

He joined Houston-based Bracewell LLP as a lawyer and energy lobbyist and became partner in the firm.

Upon reports that Holmstead might have been appointed to a high-level position in the Environmental Protection Agency or the Trump Cabinet, The Washington Post'' reported that Holmstead had filed a new, revised lobbying disclosure indicating he had dropped all of his longtime lobbying clients, including Duke Energy, DTE Energy, and Ameren, which he had represented since 2007 in his role with Bracewell.

Personal life
Jeff Holmstead is one of five children born to Ralph Kay Holmstead and Melly (Mary Louise Gillison) Holmstead, who were married in the Salt Lake Temple in 1959. Three years later, in 1962, they moved to Boulder, Colorado, where they spent 51 years until his death in 2014, and the entire family practiced their Mormon faith, as his family and children continue to do today. He and his father served first as missionaries, then as congregants and bishops in the Church of Jesus Christ of Latter-day Saints. His father had been a missionary in Tegucigalpa, Honduras and Quetzaltenango, Guatemala, where he learned to speak Spanish fluently. His father graduated from BYU at the top of his class, after working his way through college managing a farm, shearing sheep, and finishing cement. He was a businessman, real estate broker, and  investor in Boulder, Colorado.

Jeff Holmstead is a lifelong Mormon and remains active and serves as a bishop in his church. He speaks fluent Spanish. He also is a long-time soccer fan. He and his wife, Lisa (Elizabeth T. Holmstead), are both from Colorado and together have four grown children. Since 2013, they had lived in Gaithersburg, Maryland.
 Before 2013, they had lived in Washington, D.C. for two years. They enjoy hiking and the outdoors with their family.

Education
 Fairview High School, Boulder, Colorado, 1978
 Brigham Young University, Provo, Utah, BA, economics and English, Summa Cum Laude, 1984
 Yale Law School, New Haven, Connecticut, JD, 1987

References

External sources
 Reilly, A. Early skimishes on Trump policies prefigure long legal war.  Greenwire, in E&E News. Thursday, April 27, 2017
 Bureau of National Affairs ( (Arlington, Virginia)), 2004. Environment Reporter - Volume 35, Issues 26-50 - Pages 1571, 2093, 2333, etc.
 Collins, C. Toxic Loopholes: Failures and Future Prospects for Environmental Law. Cambridge University Press. 2010. 
 CQ Researcher. Issues for Debate in American Public Policy: Selections from CQ Researcher. CQ Press, Mar 20, 2017. 
 Devine, R.S. Bush Versus the Environment - Page 138. Knopf Doubleday Publishing Group, Dec 18, 2007. 
 Faber, D. Capitalizing on Environmental Injustice: The Polluter-Industrial Complex in the Age of Globalization. Rowman & Littlefield Publishers, Jul 17, 2008. 
 Funk, W.F., Lubbers, J.S., Pou, C. Federal Administrative Procedure Sourcebook - Page 824. American Bar Association, 2008. 
 Goodell, J. Big Coal: The Dirty Secret Behind America's Energy Future - Page 144. Houghton Mifflin Harcourt, Apr 3, 2007.  
 Hartmann, T. Unequal Protection - Page 305. ReadHowYouWant.com, Apr 1, 2011.  
 Hightower, J. Let's Stop Beating Around the Bush: More Political Subversion from Jim Hightower. Penguin, Jul 15, 2004. 
 Isser, S. Electricity Restructuring in the United States.  Cambridge University Press, Apr 16, 2015. Page 64. 
 Layzer, J.A. Open for Business: Conservatives' Opposition to Environmental Regulation. p. 288 in Chapter 7, MIT Press, Nov 2, 2012. 
 Levin, M.A., DiSalvo, D., Shapiro, M.M. Building Coalitions, Making Policy: The Politics of the Clinton, Bush, and Obama Presidencies. Johns Hopkins University Press. 2012.  .  Jeffrey Holmstead was interviewed by an author, February 24, 2009.
 McGarity, T.O. Freedom to Harm: The Lasting Legacy of the Laissez Faire Revival. Yale University Press, Mar 19, 2013. 
 Potter, W., Penniman, N. Nation on the Take: How Big Money Corrupts Our Democracy and What We Can Do ... Bloomsbury Publishing USA, Mar 1, 2016.  
 Revesz, R., Lienke, J. Struggling for Air: Power Plants and the "War on Coal" - Page 76. Oxford University Press, Jan 11, 2016.  
 Ricci, G.R. Values and Technology: Religion and Public Life. Transaction Publishers, Dec 31, 2011. Page 132. 
 Safe, Accountable, Flexible, and Efficient transportation Equity Act of 2005. DIANE Publishing. 
 Shulman, S. Meet Jeff Holmstead.  Section of Clear Skies? Healthy Forests? pp. 69-76 In Science: Suppression and Distortion in the Bush Administration. University of California Press, 2008
 Steinzor, R., Shapiro. S. The People's Agents and the Battle to Protect the American Public: Special Interests, Government, and Threats to Health, Safety, and the Environment. 
 United States. Congress. Senate. United States Congressional Serial Set, Serial No. 14873, Senate Reports Nos. 221-259 Government Printing Office

Living people
People of the United States Environmental Protection Agency
George W. Bush administration personnel
People from Boulder, Colorado
People from Gaithersburg, Maryland
American lawyers
Trump administration personnel
Latter Day Saints from Colorado
1960 births
Latter Day Saints from Maryland